Lyndhurst was an electoral district of the Legislative Assembly in the Australian state of New South Wales, created in 1913, partly replacing Blayney and Belubula, and named after and including Lyndhurst.  It was abolished in 1920 with the introduction of proportional representation and largely absorbed into Bathurst.

Members for Lyndhurst

Election results

1917

References

Former electoral districts of New South Wales
1913 establishments in Australia
Constituencies established in 1913
1920 disestablishments in Australia
Constituencies disestablished in 1920